The Certified Correctional Health Professional (CCHP) is a designation of certification from the National Commission on Correctional Health Care. There are additional certifications in Mental Health, the practice of Nursing, and Medicine. There is also an advanced certification. All of these may be obtained after initial CCHP certification.

The CCHP program, which includes the passing of a written exam, recognizes health care professionals from a variety of disciplines and settings, and the credential has been awarded to thousands of individuals throughout the United States. Certification not only demonstrates a commitment to the profession but may reduce liability in legal suits.

References

Professional titles and certifications
Prison healthcare